The 1959 season was Djurgårdens IF's 59th in existence, their 15th season in Allsvenskan and their 10th consecutive season in the league. They were competing in Allsvenskan.

Player statistics
Appearances for competitive matches only.

|}

Goals

Total

Competitions

Overall

Allsvenskan

League table

Matches

Nordic Cup
The tournament continued into the 1960 season.

Round of 16

Quarter-finals

References
http://www.fotbollsweden.se

Djurgårdens IF Fotboll seasons
Djurgarden
Swedish football championship-winning seasons